The Paston Treasure is an oil painting that serves as a historically rare record of a cabinet of treasures in British collecting. Commissioned by either Sir Robert Paston or his father Sir William Paston in the early 1670s, it depicts a small fraction of the Paston family's collected treasures. It was executed by an unknown Dutch artist who resided at the Paston family residence at Oxnead Hall near Aylsham in Norfolk for approximately 3 months, in order to complete the commission.

The objects were collected by Sir Robert and Sir William who made acquisitions on a long journey travelling through Europe and on to Cairo and Jerusalem. The collection consisted of over 200 objects and included many natural curiosities made into decorative art objects, such as mounted seashells and ostrich eggs. The painting was unknown for centuries, and before it was donated to the Norwich Castle Museum in 1947, its last owner warned that it was "very faded, of no artistic value, only curious from an archaeological point of view." It is now on display, with the strombus shell in an enamelled mount, as part of the Norwich Castle Museum Collection.

The people shown in the painting include a girl, possibly Margaret, daughter of Robert Paston, and a young Black man, who may represent a real enslaved individual or a fictional person included to symbolise reference to William Paston’s travels.

The importance of The Paston Treasure lies in the international scope and interest of the objects portrayed, reflecting both nature and the skills of humans. It was the subject of an exhibition in 2018 in which Norwich Castle Museum in partnership with the Yale Center for British Art in the USA, reunited, for the first time in 350 years, as many as possible of the objects depicted in the painting.

The Paston Treasure is the subject of a book by senior research scientist, conservator and art-historian Spike Bucklow. The painting is also a key feature in the 2022 novel A World of Curiosities by Louise Penny.

References

See also
Highlight of the Castle

Culture in Norfolk
Dutch art
Memento mori
Musical instruments in art
Seashells in art
Skulls in art
1670s paintings
Books in art
Maps in art
Monkeys in art
Black people in art